Notomulciber sumatrensis is a species of beetle in the family Cerambycidae. It was described by Bernhard Schwarzer in 1930. It is known from Sumatra.

References

Homonoeini
Beetles described in 1930